Iesi is a town and comune of the province of Ancona in Marche, Italy.

It is an important industrial and artistic center in the floodplain on the left (north) bank of the Esino river  before its mouth on the Adriatic Sea.

History
Iesi was one of the last towns of the Umbri when, in the 4th century BC, the Senones Gauls invaded the area and ousted them. They turned it into a stronghold against the Piceni. In 283 BC the Senones were defeated by the Romans. Jesi in 247 BC became a colonia civium romanorum with the name of Aesis.

During the fall of the Western Roman Empire, Iesi was ravaged by the troops of Odoacer (476 AD) and again in 493 by the Ostrogoths of Theodoric the Great. After the Gothic War, Italy became part of the Byzantine Empire, and Jesi became one of the main centers of the new rulers, and a diocese seat. In 751 it was sacked by the Lombard troops of Aistulf, and later was a Carolingian imperial city.

Since 1130, it was an independent commune, gradually expanding its control over its surrounding agrarian region. In December 1194 the future Holy Roman Emperor Frederick II was born here: he later made Jesi a "Royal City". In the 14th century it was captured by the Papal vicar Filippo Simonetti, then by Galeotto I Malatesta (1347–1351), by Braccio da Montone in 1408, and by Francesco I Sforza, who turned it into his family's main stronghold in the Marche. In 1447 Iesi was bought by the Papal States.

Main sights

Religious buildings
Iesi cathedral: duomo built in the 13th-15th centuries. The façade and the Latin cross interior are modern.
San Floriano: 18th century convent.
San Marco: Gothic, 13th-century church just outside the old city centre. The interior has a nave and two aisles, with a 14th-century fresco by an anonymous Rimini painter.
Santa Maria delle Grazie: 15th-century church with 17th-century belltower.
San Nicolò: 13th-century church with Romanesque apse and a Gothic portal.

Secular buildings
The 14th century walls, built following the line of the Roman ones and mostly rebuilt in the 15th century by Baccio Pontelli and Francesco di Giorgio Martini. Six towers remain today.
Palazzo della Signoria, built in 1486–1498 by Francesco di Giorgio Martini. The angular tower was elevated in 1661 and received a dome, but crumbled down a few years later. Notable is the interior courtyard, with two orders of loggias, partially designed by Andrea Sansovino from 1519.
Palazzo Balleani, an example of local Baroque architecture, built from 1720 and designed by Francesco Ferruzzi. The façade has a characteristic balcony supported by four atlases (1723). The interior has precious gilded stucco decoration.
Palazzo Pianetti: Rococo palace. The wide façade has exactly one hundred windows, while the interior has a noteworthy giardino all'italiana. The palace houses the city's civic art gallery, with a series of paintings by the Venetian artist Lorenzo Lotto.
Palazzo Ricci, finished in 1547. The diamond-like bricks of the façade are inspired to famous Palazzo dei Diamanti in Ferrara.
Teatro Pergolesi, built in 1790.

Notable people

Frederick II, Holy Roman Emperor
Giancarlo Alessandrini
Giuseppe Balducci
Alice Bellagamba
Dionisio Cimarelli
Elisa Di Francisca
Giancarlo Falappa
Virna Lisi
Antonio Magini-Coletti
Roberto Mancini
Valeria Moriconi
Giovanni Battista Pergolesi
Paolo Polidori
Rafael Sabatini
Giovanna Trillini
Valentina Vezzali

International relations

 
Iesi is twinned with:
 Lucera, Italy (since 1970)
 Mayenne, France
 Waiblingen, Germany
 Galați, Romania (since 2003)

See also
Roman Catholic Diocese of Iesi

Notes and references

External links

Thayer's Gazetteer

 
Cities and towns in the Marche